Sticta arbuscula is a species of foliose lichen in the family Peltigeraceae. Found in the South American Andes, it was formally described by Bibiana Moncada and Robert Lücking in 2012. It typically associates with bryophytes from the family Lejeuneaceae and the genera Plagiochila, Metzgeria, Jubula, and Omphalanthus. The specific epithet arbuscula refers to the characteristic arbuscular isidia–branched with a stalk at the base.

References

arbuscula
Lichen species
Lichens described in 2012
Lichens of Colombia
Lichens of Ecuador
Taxa named by Robert Lücking